In formal methods of computer science, a paramorphism 
(from Greek παρά, meaning "close together") 
is an extension of the concept of catamorphism first introduced by Lambert Meertens to deal with a form which “eats its argument and keeps it too”, 
as exemplified by the factorial function. Its categorical dual is the apomorphism.

It is a more convenient version of catamorphism in that it gives the combining step function immediate access not only to the result value recursively computed from each recursive subobject, but the original subobject itself as well.

Example Haskell implementation, for lists:

cata :: (a ->       b  -> b) -> b -> [a] ->  b
para :: (a -> ([a], b) -> b) -> b -> [a] ->  b
ana  :: (b -> (a,            b))  ->  b  -> [a]
apo  :: (b -> (a, Either [a] b))  ->  b  -> [a]

cata _ b []     = b

para f b (a:as) = f a (as, para f b as)
para _ b []     = b

ana  u b = case u b of (a,       b') -> a : ana u b'

apo  u b = case u b of (a, Right b') -> a : apo u b'
                       (a, Left  as) -> a : as

See also
 Morphism
 Morphisms of F-algebras
 From an initial algebra to an algebra: Catamorphism
 From a coalgebra to a final coalgebra: Anamorphism
 An anamorphism followed by an catamorphism: Hylomorphism
 Extension of the idea of anamorphisms: Apomorphism

References

External links 

Blogs: 

Talks: 
 Recursion schemes Haskell package

Recursion schemes